Dries De Bondt (born 4 July 1991, in Bornem) is a Belgian cyclist, who currently rides for UCI ProTeam .

Major results

2014
 1st :nl:GP Lucien Van Impe
 1st :nl:Liedekerkse Pijl
 1st Heusden Koers
 1st GP Maurice Raes
 2nd :nl:Ronde van Vlaams-Brabant
1st Stage 1
 5th Gooikse Pijl
2015
 1st Stage 1 (TTT) Ronde van Midden-Nederland
 1st Londerzeel Linde
 1st Merchtem
 1st Grote Prijs Stad Sint-Niklaas
 1st Londerzeel
 1st Sint-Martens
 1st Mountains classification Driebergenprijs 
 2nd :nl:GP Lucien Van Impe
 4th Gooikse Pijl
 8th Grand Prix Criquielion
 9th Handzame Classic
2016
 1st  Road race, National Amateur Road Championships
 1st Halle–Ingooigem
 1st Merchtem
 1st Londerzeel
 1st Vilvoorde- Houtem
 1st Buggenhout-Ordorp
 1st Erembodegem-Terjoden
 8th Overall Ronde de l'Oise
1st Stage 2
1st Molenstede 
1st Stage 3 & 4 Arden Challenge
1st PK East Flanders
1st Bornem Hingene
1st Sint-Joris-Weert
3rd Overall Belgian Road Cycling Cup
 8th Heistse Pijl
 8th Grote Prijs Jef Scherens
 10th Ronde van Drenthe
 10th Internationale Wielertrofee Jong Maar Moedig
2017
 1st GP Paul Borremans Viane-Geraardsbergen
 7th Grote Prijs Jean-Pierre Monseré
 10th Famenne Ardenne Classic
2018
 1st Criterium Brasschaat
 2nd Ronde van Drenthe
 2nd Tacx Pro Classic
 2nd Pollare-Ninove 
 2nd GP José Dubois - Isières 
 3rd Grote Prijs Marcel Kint
 10th Schaal Sels
2019
 1st Memorial Rik Van Steenbergen
 1st Halle–Ingooigem
 1st Grote Prijs Beeckman-De Caluwé
 1st Pollare-Ninove
 2nd Omloop van het Houtland
 2nd Criterium Brasschaat 
 3rd Overall Tour de Wallonie
 4th Heistse Pijl
 4th Slag om Norg
 8th Tour de l'Eurométropole
2020
 1st  Road race, National Road Championships
 1st  Mountains classification, Volta ao Algarve
 1st  Sprints classification, Tour de Wallonie
 1st Stage 3 Étoile de Bessèges
 2nd Druivenkoers Overijse
2021
 Giro d'Italia
 1st Sprints classification
 1st Combativity classification
 1st  Sprints classification, Tour de Wallonie
 2nd Criterium Brasschaat 
 9th Antwerp Port Epic
2022
 1st Stage 18 Giro d'Italia
 1st Textielprijs Vichte
 2nd Grand Prix de Denain
 2nd Grote Prijs Jean-Pierre Monseré
 3rd Le Samyn
 6th Overall Tour of Belgium
 1st Sprints classification
 7th Volta Limburg Classic
 8th Ronde van Drenthe
 9th Primus Classic
 9th Egmont Cycling Race

Grand Tour general classification results timeline

References

External links

1991 births
Living people
Belgian male cyclists
People from Bornem
Cyclists from Antwerp Province
Belgian Giro d'Italia stage winners